Balraj Komal (1928-2013) was an Indian poet and writer of Urdu literature. The Government of India honored Komal in 2011, with the fourth highest civilian award of Padma Shri.

Biography
Balraj Komal, born in 1928, was a freelance writer post his retirement from the Delhi Administration as an Education officer. He was a former member of Delhi Urdu Akademi and the advisory board of Sahitya Akademi, New Delhi. He has credited with several publications composed of poems, short stories and critical studies and Meri Nazmen, Parindon Bhara Aasman, Rishta-e-Dil, Agala Waraq, Ankhen Aur Paon, and Adab ki Talas are some hid known works.

A recipient of the Sahitya Akademi Award in 1985, Balraj Komal has also won Uttar Pradesh Urdu Academy Award twice(1971 and 1982) and has also received the Senior Fellowship from the Government of India. In 2011, the Government of India honored Komal again by including him in the Republic Day honours list for Padma Award.

Balraj Komal died in 2013 at the age of 85.

References

External links
 

1928 births
2013 deaths
Recipients of the Padma Shri in literature & education
Recipients of the Gangadhar National Award
Poets from Delhi
Recipients of the Sahitya Akademi Award in Urdu
20th-century Indian poets
Urdu-language poets from India